In enzymology, a glutamine-phenylpyruvate transaminase is an enzyme that catalyzes the chemical reaction

L-glutamine + phenylpyruvate  2-oxoglutaramate + L-phenylalanine

Thus, the two substrates of this enzyme are L-glutamine and phenylpyruvate, whereas its two products are 2-oxoglutaramate and L-phenylalanine.

This enzyme belongs to the family of transferases, to be specific, the transaminases, that transfer nitrogenous groups.  The systematic name of this enzyme class is L-glutamine:phenylpyruvate aminotransferase. Other names in common use include glutamine transaminase K, and glutamine-phenylpyruvate aminotransferase.  It employs one cofactor, pyridoxal phosphate.

Structural studies

References

 
 

EC 2.6.1
Pyridoxal phosphate enzymes
Enzymes of known structure